The September EP is a 2005 EP by French symphonic black metal band Anorexia Nervosa.

Track listing
 "Sister September" (Director's Cut Mix)
 "La Chouanne" *
 "Quintessence" *
 "I'll Kill You"
 "The Shining" (live)*
 "Stabat Mater Dolorosa" (live)*
 "Worship Manifesto" (live)*
 "Le Portail de la Vierge" (live)*

Previously unreleased *

La Chouanne / Originally performed by Forbidden Site

Quintessence / Originally performed by Darkthrone

I'll Kill You / Originally performed by X Japan

Live tracks recorded on 7 May 2005 in Clermont Ferrand (France).

References

2005 EPs
Anorexia Nervosa (band) albums